The 2015–16 season is Eastern's 61st season in the top-tier division in Hong Kong football. Eastern will compete in the Premier League, Senior Challenge Shield and FA Cup in this season.

Key events
 31 May 2015: Hong Kong defender Leung Chi Wing retires from professional football.
 31 May 2015: Hong Kong striker Yiu Hok Man retires from professional football.
 1 June 2015: Hong Kong defender Man Pei Tak retires from professional football.
 1 June 2015: Hong Kong midfielder Ju Yingzhi joins the club from Sun Pegasus on a free transfer.
 3 June 2015: Hong Kong defender Cheng King Ho joins the club from I-Sky Yuen Long on a free transfer.
 9 June 2015: Australian striker Dylan Macallister leaves the club and joins Rockdale City Suns on a free transfer.
 10 June 2015: South Korea midfielder Han Jae-woong joins the club from Biu Chun Rangers for an undisclosed fee.
 10 June 2015: Hong Kong midfielder Leung Tsz Chun leaves the club and joins KC Southern for an undisclosed fee.
 12 June 2015: Cameroon-born Hong Kong midfielder Eugene Mbome joins the club from Biu Chun Rangers on a free transfer.
 12 June 2015: Hong Kong midfielder Xu Deshuai joins the club from Kitchee for an undisclosed fee.
 16 June 2015: English striker Rohan Ricketts leaves the club after contract expires.
 19 June 2015: Hong Kong goalkeeper Ho Kwok Chuen joins the club from Sun Pegasus on a free transfer.
 23 June 2015: Nigerian defender Festus Baise joins the club from Sun Pegasus on a free transfer.
 24 June 2015: Australian striker Andrew Barisic joins the club from Melbourne Knights for an undisclosed fee.
 24 June 2015: Hong Kong Liang Zicheng leaves the club and joins South China for an undisclosed fee.
 30 June 2015: Hong Kong midfielder Lee Hong Lim joins the club from Sun Pegasus on a free transfer.
 3 July 2015: Hong Kong goalkeeper Liang Yuhao joins the club from Wofoo Tai Po on a free transfer.
 8 July 2015: Hong Kong defender Tsang Chi Hau joins the club from Kitchee for an undisclosed fee.
 9 July 2015: Hong Kong defender Tsang Kam To joins the club from Kitchee for an undisclosed fee.
 9 July 2015: Hong Kong defender Kwok Kin Pong leaves the club and joins Pegasus for an undisclosed fee.
 11 July 2015: Hong Kong midfielder Luk Chi Ho Michael leaves the club and joins KC Southern for an undisclosed fee.
 17 July 2015: Hong Kong defender Leung Kwok Wai leaves the club and joins Dream Metro Gallery on a free transfer.
 21 July 2015: Hong Kong defender Pak Wing Chak retires from professional football.
 23 July 2015: Hong Kong defender Lee Chi Ho leaves the club and joins Biu Chun Rangers on a free transfer.
 23 July 2015: Hong Kong goalkeeper Li Hon Ho leaves the club and joins Tai Po on a free transfer.

Players

Squad information

Last update: 28 July 2015
Source: South China Football Team
Ordered by squad number.
LPLocal player; FPForeign player; NRNon-registered player

Transfers

In

Summer

Out

Summer

Loan In

Summer

Loan Out

Summer

Club

Coaching staff

Squad statistics

Overall Stats
{|class="wikitable" style="text-align: center;"
|-
!width="100"|
!width="60"|League
!width="60"|Senior Shield
!width="60"|FA Cup
!width="60"|Total Stats
|-
|align=left|Games played    ||  0  ||  0  ||  0  || 0
|-
|align=left|Games won       ||  0  ||  0  ||  0  || 0
|-
|align=left|Games drawn     ||  0  ||  0  ||  0  || 0
|-
|align=left|Games lost      ||  0  ||  0  ||  0  || 0
|-
|align=left|Goals for       ||  0  ||  0  ||  0  || 0
|-
|align=left|Goals against   ||  0  ||  0  ||  0  || 0
|- =
|align=left|Players used    ||  0  ||  0  ||  0  || 0
|-
|align=left|Yellow cards    ||  0  ||  0  ||  0  || 0
|-
|align=left|Red cards       ||  0  ||  0  ||  0  || 0
|-

Appearances and goals
Key

No. = Squad number

Pos. = Playing position

Nat. = Nationality

Apps = Appearances

GK = Goalkeeper

DF = Defender

MF = Midfielder

FW = Forward

Numbers in parentheses denote appearances as substitute. Players with number struck through and marked  left the club during the playing season.

Top scorers

The list is sorted by shirt number when total goals are equal.

Disciplinary record
Includes all competitive matches.Players listed below made at least one appearance for Southern first squad during the season.

Substitution Record
Includes all competitive matches.

Last updated: 30 July 2015

Captains

Competitions

Overall

First Division League

Classification

Results summary

References

Eastern Sports Club seasons
Hong Kong football clubs 2015–16 season